Minn of the Mississippi is an illustrated children's book by Holling C. Holling. Though short, it is more a novel than a picture book. First published in 1951, it received the Newbery Honor award the next year.

The book tells the story of a snapping turtle that hatches near the headwaters of the Mississippi River. It then goes on a journey down the river to Louisiana and the river's delta as the massive watercourse empties into the Gulf of Mexico.  The turtle gets to see much of the Midwestern United States and American South along its way.

Like most of Holling's works, Minn is lushly illustrated, containing many full-page color paintings. Pages with text in them are also generously illustrated, with black-and-white pen-and-ink drawings, many with explanatory captions (to accompany the action of the story), in the margins.

External links

Minn of the Mississippi at the Open Library

1951 children's books
American children's novels
American picture books
Books about turtles
Children's novels about animals
Mississippi River
Newbery Honor-winning works
Clarion Books books